Hongkou Football Stadium is an interchange station between Lines 3 and 8 on the Shanghai Metro.

To interchange between these two lines it is unnecessary to exit the station and re-enter, though the platform for Line 3 is located above ground, while the platform for Line 8 is entirely underground, there has been escalators in the fare area since 2012, incorporated into the recently built Hongkou Plaza shopping mall.

Furthermore, the Line 3 platform has no barrier-free ground access, preventing transfers by disabled people without assistance.

Station Layout

Places nearby
 Hongkou Stadium, a large soccer stadium. There are 3 squash courts inside and a climbing wall that has been rebuilt in December 2008.
 Lu Xun Park
 Duolun Road Cultural Street
 Shanghai International Studies University, Dalian Road Campus
 Bus station with regional buses to places in the vicinity of Shanghai like Songjiang and Zhujiajiao (less than at Shanghai Stadium)

Surface transport 

Passengers may transfer to bus lines 21, 51, 52, 70, 132, 139, 167, 502, 537, 597, 854, Overnight Bus Routes 310 and 329, Airport Bus #4 (for Pudong International Airport), and a "lightering" bus route for Shanghai Metro Line 8 which runs from People's Square to Yueyang Hospital, only during rush hours.

References

Line 3, Shanghai Metro
Line 8, Shanghai Metro
Shanghai Metro stations in Hongkou District
Railway stations in China opened in 2000